Windows X may refer to:

X Window System, a windowing system for bitmap displays, common on UNIX-like computers
An implementation of the X server for Microsoft Windows; see 
Windows 10, a Microsoft operating system

See also
Windows key 
Windows XP
Windows 9x
List of Microsoft Windows versions
Windows (disambiguation)